Long County may refer to:

Long County, Shaanxi (陇县), China
Long County, Georgia, United States